Plaza Chacabuco is an underground metro station of Line 3 of the Santiago Metro network, in Santiago, Chile. It is an underground, between the Conchalí and Hospitales stations on Line 3. It is located at the intersection of Independencia Avenue with Hipódromo Chile. The station was opened on 22 January 2019 as part of the inaugural section of the line, from Los Libertadores to Fernando Castillo Velasco.

Etymology
The station is located under Plaza Chacabuco; that square receives this name because the Liberation Army was established there after the Battle of Chacabuco, on February 13, 1817. In the pictogram that represents the station, one of the horses that exists at the entrance to the Hippodrome Chile appears.

References

External links 
Metro de Santiago website (in Spanish)

Santiago Metro stations
Railway stations opened in 2019
Santiago Metro Line 3